Jim Watters (born January 30, 1946 in Vancouver, British Columbia) is a Canadian former pair skater.  With partner Faye Strutt, he won the bronze medal at the Canadian Figure Skating Championships in 1964 and 1965 and competed in the 1964 Winter Olympics.

Results
pairs with Faye Strutt

References

1946 births
Living people
Canadian male pair skaters
Figure skaters at the 1964 Winter Olympics
Olympic figure skaters of Canada
Figure skaters from Vancouver